The Aedeomyia mosquito, Aedeomyia (Aedeomyia) catasticta, is a species of zoophilic mosquito belonging to the genus Aedeomyia. It is found in India, Sri Lanka, Hawaii, Southeast Asian countries and Australia.

Description
Adult female is short and rounded wing densely clothed in broad scales. Antennal segments are short and thick. Proboscis dark with three pale bands. Part of thorax show stellate setae and enormously long setae. Larva can be found from deep swampy habitats and clings to submerged stems of Pistia, Nitella. In Queensland, Alfui virus has been isolated from the adults.

References

External links
aedeomyia mosquito - Aedeomyia catasticta Knab, 1909
CONTRIBUTIONS TO THE MOSQUITO FAUNA OF SOUTHEAST ASIA. VII. GENUS AEDEOMYL4 THEOBALD IN SOUTHEAST ASIA.
Larval Survey of Surface Water-Breeding Mosquitoes During Irrigation Development in the Mahaweli Project, Sri Lanka
Efficacy of bird-baited traps placed at different heights for collecting ornithophilic mosquitoes in eastern Queensland, Australia
Potentialities for Accidental Establishment of Exotic Mosquitoes in Hawaii
Land Use Influences Mosquito Communities and Disease Risk
Biology of Culex sitiens, a Predominant Mosquito in Phang Nga, Thailand after a Tsunami

Culicinae